The 1978 IAAF World Cross Country Championships was held in Glasgow, Scotland, at the Bellahouston Park on 25 March 1978.   A report on the event was given in the Glasgow Herald.

Complete results for men, junior men, women, medallists, 
 and the results of British athletes were published.

Medallists

Race results

Senior men's race (12.3 km)

Note: Athletes in parentheses did not score for the team result

Junior men's race (7.036 km)

Note: Athletes in parentheses did not score for the team result

Senior women's race (4.728 km)

Note: Athletes in parentheses did not score for the team result

Medal table (unofficial)

Note: Totals include both individual and team medals, with medals in the team competition counting as one medal.

Participation
An unofficial count yields the participation of 358 athletes from 27 countries.  This is in agreement with the official numbers as published.

 (7)
 (19)
 (18)
 (5)
 (21)
 (21)
 (6)
 (21)
 (17)
 (9)
 (15)
 (12)
 (6)
 (14)
 (5)
 (6)
 (15)
 (5)
 (21)
 (18)
 (21)
 (3)
 (4)
 (13)
 (21)
 (21)
 (14)

See also
 1978 IAAF World Cross Country Championships – Senior men's race
 1978 IAAF World Cross Country Championships – Junior men's race
 1978 IAAF World Cross Country Championships – Senior women's race
 1978 in athletics (track and field)

References

External links 
The World Cross Country Championships 1973-2005
GBRathletics

 
World Athletics Cross Country Championships
C
Iaaf World Cross Country Championships, 1978
International athletics competitions hosted by Scotland
International sports competitions in Glasgow
Cross country running in the United Kingdom
IAAF World Cross Country Championships, 1978
IAAF World Cross Country Championships